Jiao Huang (born 8 July 1936) is a Chinese actor best known for his roles as Kangxi Emperor in Yongzheng Emperor, Qianlong Emperor in Qianlong Dynasty, and Emperor Jing of Han in The Emperor in Han Dynasty.

Early life and education
Jiao was born in Beijing, on July 8, 1936, while his ancestral home in Zhangjiakou, Hebei. His father, Jiao Shufan, graduated from Yenching University and was a teacher at the University of International Business and Economics after the establishment of the Communist State in 1949. Due to the Second Sino-Japanese War, his family moved to Shanghai. In 1955, he was accepted to Shanghai Theatre Academy, where he graduated in 1959. After university, he was assigned to Shanghai Youth Drama Troupe.

Acting career
Jiao first came to public attention in 1958 at the age of 22, appearing on Xie Jin's Small stories in Big Waves.

In 1966, Mao Zedong launched the Cultural Revolution, Jiao was brought to be persecuted and forced to work in the fields instead of acting.

In 1975, he got a small role as a spy in the war film Memorable Battle.

Jiao received his first leading role in a feature film called Desert Camel (1978).

In 1983, he starred with Wang Hui and Guo Weilin in Pioneers' Footprints.

Jiao became widely known to audiences with Antony and Cleopatra (1984), a tragedy by William Shakespeare.

In 1986, he was cast in Bible for Girls, which is set to premiere at the same year.

In 1987, he earned critical acclaim for his performance as He Jingming in Engineers, for which he received a Best Supporting Actor at the 8th Flying Apsaras Awards.

He co-starred with You Yong and Song Jia in Spacious Courtyard, adapted from Qiong Yao's romance novel of the same title.

In 1991, he played the lead role in Xie Fei's drama film The Sun om the Roof of the World.

In 1993, he was cast as Ding Han in First Attraction, opposite Xi Meijuan, Xu Huanshan and Zheng Qianlong.

Jiao's role as Kangxi Emperor on the historical television series Yongzheng Dynasty (1997) brought him to the attention of a wider audience; he received an Outstanding Supporting Actor at the 17th China TV Golden Eagle Awards and won a Best Actor at the 19th Flying Sky Television Awards.

In 2000, he played the role of Zhong Chaolin in Hu Mei's television series Loyal, for which he received an Audience's Choice for Actor nomination at the 20th China TV Golden Eagle Awards.

In 2002, he portrayed Qianlong Emperor in the historical television series Qianlong Dynasty. That same year, he had key supporting role as Kangxi Emperor in Li Wei the Magistrate.

He had a supporting role as Emperor Jing of Han in the historical television series The Emperor in Han Dynasty (2004).

In 2006, he earned an Outstanding Supporting Actor nomination at the 27th Flying Sky Television Awards for his performance as Li Guorong in Return In Glory.

Jiao made a guest appearance as Laozi on Confucius, a biographical film starring Chow Yun-fat as Confucius.

In 2013, Jiao played the title role in All Quiet in Peking, co-starring Liu Ye, Chen Baoguo and Ni Dahong.

He appeared as Qianlong Emperor in Hu Mei's Enter the Forbidden City (2019).

Personal life
Jiao was married three times. His third wife, Chen Xiaoli, was a reporter of Wen Wei Po. They have a daughter. His son is an American citizen.

Filmography

Film

Television

Drama

Film and TV Awards

References

External links
Jiao Huang on chinesemov.com

1936 births
Living people
Actors from Beijing
Shanghai Theatre Academy alumni
Chinese male film actors
Chinese male television actors